Long Burn the Fire is the second studio album by the Detroit rock band, Black Merda. The band’s name was altered to Mer-Da on the album’s front cover. It was released by Chess Records subsidiary Janus in 1972. The album sleeve features only guitarists Anthony and Charles Hawkins, and bassist VC L. Veasey. Original drummer Tyrone Hite had left the band and was not officially replaced. Later, session drummer Bob Crowder was hired just before the recording sessions. The original album was long out of print before being reissued on CD by TuffCity Records in 1996. All of the album’s tracks are also collected on the 2005 Black Merda compilation The Folks from Mother's Mixer.

Critical reception 
Reviewing in Christgau's Record Guide: Rock Albums of the Seventies (1981), Robert Christgau regarded Long Burn the Fire as a "follow-up" to the 1971 Sly and the Family Stone album There's a Riot Goin' On and went on to say:

Track listing
 "For You" – 4:38
 "The Folks from Mother’s Mixer" – 4:09
 "My Mistake" – 5:25
 "Lying" – 4:25
 "Long Burn the Fire" – 3:21
 "Sometimes I Wish" – 3:45
 "I Got a Woman" – 4:53
 "We Made Up" – 3:41

Personnel
Anthony Hawkins – acoustic guitar, piano, tambourine, lead and backing vocals
VC L. Veasey – bass, acoustic guitar, lead and backing vocals
Charles Hawkins – electric guitar, lead and backing vocals
Bob Crowder — drums

References 

1972 albums
Black Merda albums
Acid rock albums